The Lasiocampidae are a family of moths also known as eggars, tent caterpillars, snout moths (although this also refers to the Pyralidae), or lappet moths. Over 2,000 species occur worldwide, and probably not all have been named or studied. It is the sole family in superfamily Lasiocampoidea.

Etymology
Their common name "snout moths" comes from the unique protruding mouth parts of some species which resemble a large nose. They are called "lappet moths" due to the decorative skin flaps found on the caterpillar's prolegs. The name "eggars" comes from the neat egg-shaped cocoons of some species.

Description
Caterpillars of this family are large and are most often hairy, especially on their sides. Most have skin flaps on their prolegs and a pair of dorsal glands on their abdomens. They feed on leaves of many different trees and shrubs, and often use these same plants to camouflage their cocoons. Some species are called tent caterpillars due to their habit of living together in nests spun of silk.

As adults, the moths in this family are large bodied with broad wings and may still have the characteristic elongated mouth parts, or have reduced mouthparts and not feed as adults. They are either diurnal or nocturnal. Females lay a large number of eggs which are flat in appearance and either smooth or slightly pitted. In tent caterpillars, the eggs are deposited in masses and covered with a material that hardens in air. Females are generally larger and slower than the males, but the sexes otherwise resemble each other. Moths are typically brown or grey, with hairy legs and bodies.

Subfamilies and tribes
Subfamily Chionopsychinae (1 genus, 2 species)

Subfamily Chondrosteginae (2 genera)

Subfamily Lasiocampinae (130 genera)
Tribe Gastropachini (previously subfamily Gastropachinae)
Tribe Lasiocampini
Tribe Malacosomatini

Subfamily Macromphaliinae (15 genera)

Subfamily Poecilocampinae (two genera)

Genera incertae sedis
 Bhima
 Borocera
 Nesara

Selected North American species
American lappet moth, Phyllodesma americana 
Riley's lappet moth, Heteropacha rileyana
Eastern tent caterpillar, Malacosoma americanum
Forest tent caterpillar, Malacosoma disstrium
Western tent caterpillar, Malacosoma californicum
Larch moth, Tolype laricis
Velleda lappet moth, or large tolype Tolype velleda

See also
List of Lasiocampidae genera

References

Fitzgerald, Terrence D. (1995) The Tent Caterpillars. Cornell University Press: Ithaca, NY.
Watson, L. & Dallwitz, M. J. (2003 onwards) British Insects: The Families of Lepidoptera.
Maier, C. T.; Lemmon, C. R.; Fengler, J. M.; Schweitzer, D. F. & Reardon, R. C. (2004) Caterpillars on the Foliage of Conifers in the Northeastern United States.. USDA Forest Service, Forest Health Technology Enterprise Team: Morgantown, WV.

External links
 Fauna Europaea
 Vadim Zolotuhin & Erik J. van Nieukerken Fauna Europaea experts
 Insecta.pro

 
Moth families